Manzoor Hussain (28 October 1958 – 29 August 2022), better known as Manzoor Junior, was a Pakistani field hockey player.

Manzoor Hussain played in a forward position as a striker between 1975 and 1984 and was capped 175 times with 86 goals to his credit. 

Manzoor was part of the Pakistan team that won the Bronze Medal in the 1976 Olympics in Montreal. Eight years later, he was Captain of the Pakistan team that won the Gold Medal at the 1984 Olympics in Los Angeles. 

Manzoor was also a member of the Pakistan team that won the World Cup in 1978 and 1982. He was known for his exceptional stick work, and one of its remarkable displays was in the 1982 World Cup final where he scored the goal by dodging six German defenders.

Manzoor Hussain and his two brothers, Maqsood Hussain and Mahmood Hussain represented Pakistan in the 1984 Men's Hockey Champions Trophy in Karachi in a match.

Awards and recognition
Pride of Performance Award in 1984 by the President of Pakistan.

See also
Pakistan Hockey Federation

References

External links
 
 Pakistan Hockey Federation website

1958 births
2022 deaths
Olympic field hockey players of Pakistan
Field hockey players at the 1976 Summer Olympics
Field hockey players at the 1984 Summer Olympics
Olympic gold medalists for Pakistan
Olympic bronze medalists for Pakistan
Pakistani male field hockey players
Field hockey players from Sialkot
Olympic medalists in field hockey
Recipients of the Pride of Performance
Medalists at the 1976 Summer Olympics
Medalists at the 1984 Summer Olympics
Asian Games gold medalists for Pakistan
Field hockey players at the 1978 Asian Games
Field hockey players at the 1982 Asian Games
Medalists at the 1978 Asian Games
Medalists at the 1982 Asian Games
Asian Games medalists in field hockey
1978 Men's Hockey World Cup players